Akeem Brian Davis-Gaither (born September 21, 1997) is an American football linebacker for the Cincinnati Bengals of the National Football League (NFL). He played college football at Appalachian State.

Early years
Davis-Gaither attended Thomasville High School in Thomasville, North Carolina. As a senior in 2015, he had 115 tackles with five sacks and also had eight rushing touchdowns as a running back. He committed to Appalachian State University to play college football.

College career
Davis-Gaither played at Appalachian State from 2015 to 2019. As a senior in 2019, he was the Sun Belt Conference Defensive Player of the Year after recording 101 tackles, five sacks and an interception. For his career, Davis-Gaither had 201 tackles, 6.5 sacks and the interception.

Professional career

Davis-Gaither was selected by the Cincinnati Bengals in the fourth round with the 107th pick of the 2020 NFL Draft.
In Week 17 against the Baltimore Ravens, Davis-Gaither recorded his first career interception off a pass thrown by Lamar Jackson during the 38–3 loss.

On November 9, 2021, Davis-Gaither was placed on injured reserve after suffering a foot injury in Week 9.  In 2022, Davis recorded a career high 46 tackles and his first fumble recovery.  He also intercepted a pass in the Bengals wildcard playoff win against the Baltimore Ravens.

References

External links
Appalachian State Mountaineers bio

1997 births
Living people
People from Thomasville, North Carolina
Players of American football from North Carolina
American football linebackers
Appalachian State Mountaineers football players
Cincinnati Bengals players